The Aerodyne Shaman is a series of French single-place paragliders that was designed by Michel Le Blanc and produced by Aerodyne Technologies of Talloires.

Design and development
The Shaman was designed as a high-performance cross country glider intended for experienced paraglider pilots, with the four models each named for their relative size. The design borrows from the Aerodyne Blaster's profile, with an emphasis on high-speed stability.

The small, medium and large sizes were developed and certified first as AFNOR Performance, with the extra-small size developed and certified later.

The glider was available in two versions, "standard" and "full race", the latter with trimmers and thin lines on the upper line system.

Operational history
Shamans were flown by four pilots in ten Paragliding World Cup competition races, between April 2004 and March 2011.

Variants
Shaman XS
Extra small-sized model for lighter pilots. The glider model is AFNOR P certified.
Shaman S
Small-sized model for lighter pilots. The glider model is AFNOR P certified.
Shaman M
Mid-sized model for medium-weight pilots. The glider model is AFNOR P certified.
Shaman L
Large-sized model for heavier pilots. The glider model is AFNOR P certified.

Specifications (Shaman M)

References

Shaman
Paragliders